The Theater Trier is the municipal theatre of Trier, Rhineland-Palatinate, offering opera and musical, dance and drama. The company dates back to 1802. The current house was completed in 1964, and needs renovation. The director (Intendant) since 2018 is 

Since 1995, the theatre has run a series of unknown operas, initiated by Heinz Lukas-Kindermann. It included world premieres such as Zemlinsky's Sarema, Die unendliche Geschichte by Siegfried Matthus, and Fausta by Heinz Heckmann, German premieres such as The Voyage by Philip Glass, and revivals of neglected repertoire such as Karl Goldmark's Merlin and Koanga by Frederick Delius.

History

1802 to 1944 

When Trier was a Roman town, there was already theatre. In 1802, Napoleon visited the French-occupied city and decreed that the former Capuchin monastery was designated for the establishment of a theatre. From 1802 to 1944, the theatre played in the building on Fahrstraße. In 1908, Heinz Tietjen conducted a performance of Wagner's Der Ring des Nibelungen. Before the closure of the theatre ordered by the Nazis, the last performance in this building took place on 16 July 1944 with Der Rosenkavalier by Richard Strauss. On 23 December 1944, the theatre building in Fahrstraße was destroyed by an Allied air raid.

After World War II 

After the end of the war, the theatre played provisionally in the Treveris Hall until 1950, then from 1950 to 1964 in the Bischof-Korum-Haus in Rindertanzstraße. On 12 January 1962, the foundation stone was laid for a new building , which was constructed by 1964 according to plans by the architect . On 27 September 1964, the theatre opened in the new building with a premiere of Beethoven's Die Weihe des Hauses.

The house seats 622 spectators. It is surrounded by a side stage and a back stage with sliding stage and built-in revolving stage. The stage is separated from the auditorium by a curved iron curtain. The orchestra pit has space for 65 musicians on two mobile podiums. When raised, these podiums form the front stage. The stage opening can be enlarged or reduced by means of a variable stage portal.

The theatre employs a staff of more than 250 people, including the acting ensemble, the musical theatre ensemble with opera choir,  and children's and youth choir, the ballet ensemble and the philharmonic orchestra, which since 2018 has been led by general music director Jochem Hochstenbach. Ensemble members and guest performers have included Franz Grundheber, Anja Kampe,

In the spring of 2014, the city council decided to continue the theatre's operation. From 2021, director Karl M. Sibelius will be assisted by co-director Lajos Wenzel; contracts, also for Jochem Hochstenbach, run to 2028.

Redevelopment 
Since 2015, the future of the theatre has been discussed, as the building is in need of renovation due to long-neglected building maintenance and there are considerable space problems. After controversial discussions, in which the construction of a second location elsewhere was also considered, according to an expert opinion from 2016, the costs for a pure renovation of the existing theatre building were around 32 million euros, for renovation and expansion up to 110 million euros. Therefore, at the beginning of 2019, the Trier City Council decided to renovate the existing theatre, which will essentially be preserved in its current form – however, the demolition and new construction of the foyer will be required.

Rediscoveries and world premieres 
The theatre has focused on lesser-known operas since 1995, when Heinz Lukas-Kindermann initiated a series Unbekannte Opern. He was often the stage director when world premieres, German premieres and revivals of neglected operas took place in Trier. These included:
 1995/96: Sarema by Alexander von Zemlinsky
 1996/97: Merlin by Karl Goldmark
 1996/97: Ritter Blaubart by Jacques Offenbach
 1996/97: Die Glasmenagerie (The Glass Menagerie) by Antonio Bibalo – world premiere
 1997/98: Die Soldaten by Manfred Gurlitt
 1997: Die Geschichte vom kleine Bergsee und dem alten Adler (The Story of the Little Blue Mountain Lake and the Old Eagle) by Wilfried Hiller – world premiere
 1998/99: Die Kathrin by Erich Wolfgang Korngold
 1999/2000: Koanga by Frederick Delius – German premiere
 2000: Trilogy of Summer Retreat by Ingomar Grünauer – world premiere EXPO 2000
 2000: Margot la Rouge by Frederick Delius
 2000: Ein Bericht für eine Akademie (A Report for an Academy) by Jan Klusák – German premiere
 2002: Pinocchio by Wilfried Hiller – world premiere
 2003: Nordische Ballade (Nordic Ballad) by Manfred Gurlitt (production: Lukas-Kindermann) – world premiere
 2004: Die unendliche Geschichte, after The Neverending Story, by Siegfried Matthus – world premiere (production: Lukas-Kindermann)
 2004: Das Orangenmädchen by Martin Lingnau / Edith Jeske – world premiere
 2005: Die Rheinnixen by Jacques Offenbach, original version (production: Bruno Berger-Gorski)
 2005: Quo Vadis by Konstantin Wecker / Gerold Theobalt Antikenfestspiele – world premiere
 2007: Fausta by  / Heiner Martini (production: Hermann Keckeis) – world premiere
 2007: Cusanus – Fragmente der Unendlichkeit (Cusanus ― Fragments of Infinity) by Boudewijn Buckinx (production: Sven Grützmacher) – world premiere
 2011: The Voyage by Philip Glass (production: Birgit Scherzer) – German premiere
 2015: Ur_ by Anna Thorvaldsdóttir (production: Thorleifur Örn Arnarsson) – world premiere

Discography 
 Sarema – Die Rose vom Kaukasus / Alexander von Zemlinsky (1871–1942). With Karin Clark, Laszlo Lukas, Norbert Kleinhenn, Andreas Scheel, Juri Zinovenko, Nick Herbosch, Florian Simson, Chor and Extrachor of the Stadttheaters Trier, Städtisches Orchester Trier conducted by István Dénes. Koch International 1996.

References

Further reading 
 Rudolf Günther, Alexander Reverchon (ed.): Das Theater der Stadt Trier 1945–1995. Gesammelte Aufsätze von Claus Zander, Trier 2007, .

External links 

 
 Theater Trier (articles, in German) Neue Musikzeitung

Theatres in Rhineland-Palatinate
Culture in Trier